Federal elections were held in Germany on 25 January 1907. Despite the Social Democratic Party (SPD) receiving a clear plurality of votes, they were hampered by the unequal constituency sizes that favoured rural seats. As a result, the Centre Party remained the largest party in the Reichstag after winning 101 of the 397 seats, whilst the SPD won only 43. Voter turnout was 84.7%.

This election was known as the "Hottentot Election" due to the scandal  over the ongoing genocide of the Khoisan people in German South West Africa.

Results

Alsace-Lorraine

References

Federal elections in Germany
Germany
1907 elections in Germany
Elections in the German Empire
January 1907 events